Labeo sanagaensis is a species of Cyprinid fish in the genus Labeo from north western Cameroon.

References 

Endemic fauna of Cameroon
Labeo
Fish described in 1997